The James F. D. Lanier Residence, also known as the James F. D. and Harriet Lanier House is an  historic house located at 123 East 35th Street between Park and Lexington Avenues in the Murray Hill neighborhood of Manhattan, New York City.

History
The residence was built in 1901–03, replacing two older houses on the site, and was designed in the Beaux-Arts style by Hoppin & Koen, who had studied at the École des Beaux-Arts in Paris, and worked in the office of McKim, Mead & White.  The home was built for James F. D. Lanier, son of banker Charles D. Lanier, and his wife Harriet Bishop Lanier, daughter of Heber R. Bishop.

The house was designated a New York City landmark in 1979, and was added to the National Register of Historic Places in 1982.

The house was listed for sale by Christie’s Real Estate in April 2022 for $33 million. The owner at the time was Bassam Alghanim, the Kuwaiti billionaire co-owner of the Alghanim Industries conglomerate.

See also

National Register of Historic Places listings in Manhattan from 14th to 59th Streets
List of New York City Designated Landmarks in Manhattan from 14th to 59th Streets

References
Notes

External links

Beaux-Arts architecture in New York City
Houses completed in 1903
Houses in Manhattan
Houses on the National Register of Historic Places in Manhattan
Murray Hill, Manhattan
New York City Designated Landmarks in Manhattan
1903 establishments in New York City